Seeshaupt is a municipality  in the Weilheim-Schongau district, in Bavaria, Germany.

Gallery

References 

Weilheim-Schongau